The Rashad Shawa Cultural Center is a cultural center that was built in 1985, in Rimal, Gaza, State of Palestine. The place was named after its founder Rashad al-Shawa, the city's Palestinian mayor who served in office for 11 years. The building was completed 1988.

Description and function
The building is two-story tall, with triangular roof. The center have a meeting place, where people meet for celebrations, a library, and a stage where exhibition is distributed.

Theatrical exhibitions
In September 2009, the cultural center had a three-day festival, that featured training workshops. The workshops were designed so that the film makers can get their training by using films from festival's committee.

References

Cultural centers
Buildings and structures in Gaza City